
Gmina Tuchola is an urban-rural gmina (administrative district) in Tuchola County, Kuyavian-Pomeranian Voivodeship, in north-central Poland.

The gmina contains part of the protected area called Tuchola Landscape Park.

Villages
Apart from the town of Tuchola, Gmina Tuchola contains the villages and settlements of Barłogi, Biała, Białowieża, Bielska Struga, Bladowo, Bladowo-Wybudowanie, Borki, Brody, Dąbrówka, Dziekcz, Fojutowo, Huby, Jaty, Jesionowo, Kiełpin, Kiełpin-Wymysłowo, Klocek, Końskie Błota, Koślinka, Lasek, Legbąd, Lipce, Łosiny, Lubierzyn, Mała Komorza, Mały Mędromierz, Mrowiniec, Na Polach, Nad Bladówkiem, Nad Kanałem, Nadolna Karczma, Nadolnik, Niwki, Nowa Tuchola, Ostrów, Parcele Legbądzkie, Pod Komorzą, Pod Lasem, Raciąski Młyn, Raciąż, Raciąż-Piaski, Radonek, Rzepiczna, Słupy, Stegny, Stobno, Szosa Bydgoska, Szosa Sępoleńska, Tajwan, Trzcionek, Wielka Komorza, Wiśniówka, Woziwoda, Wybudowanie Raciąskie, Wysocki Młyn, Wysoka, Wysoka Wieś, Za Jeziorem, Zielona Łąka and Zielonka.

Neighbouring gminas
Gmina Tuchola is bordered by the gminas of Cekcyn, Chojnice, Czersk, Gostycyn, Kęsowo and Śliwice.

References
Polish official population figures 2006

Tuchola
Tuchola County